Pirate Party of Bosnia and Herzegovina, also known as PiratskaPartija.ba, is a Bosnian political party.

References

External links
Official Website

2010 establishments in Bosnia and Herzegovina
Bosnia and Herzegovina
Political parties established in 2010
Political parties in Bosnia and Herzegovina